Tanja Kreil (born 1977) is a German electrician notable for filing a lawsuit against the Bundeswehr (Germany's armed forces) with European Court of Justice that forced the German military to allow women to join the armed forces.

Following the 2000 ruling, the German government changed a law that banned women from serving, and by 2001 the first female volunteers joined. However, Tanja Kreil did not join the armed forces after winning the lawsuit.

Women had been allowed to serve as officers (MDs) or enlisted personnel in the medical corps since 1975, and as musicians in the music corps since 1991.

Germany never had conscription for women (for men it existed until 2011).

See also 
 Conscription in Germany

References
 Tanja Kreil v Bundesrepublik Deutschland, C-285/98
'Deutsche Welle' article on the fifth anniversary of the court ruling

German military law
1977 births
Living people